Baron Albert de Pury (born 22 December 1940) is a Swiss biblical scholar, historian, and exegesis. A specialist in biblical history, and the literary and religious traditions of the ancient Ancient Near East, he has served on the faculty at the University of Geneva and the University of Neuchâtel as a professor of the Old Testament.

Early life and education 
De Pury is a member of a Huguenot family from Neuchâtel that was ennobled by Frederick II of Prussia in 1785. He studied theology at the University of Basel and the University of Neuchâtel before enrolling at the École Biblique in Jerusalem.

Career 
From 1966 to 1972, de Pury served on the faculty at the University of Neuchâtel's theology department as a professor of Biblical Hebrew. In 1975 he published his doctorate on the biblical figure Jacob. He taught classes on the Old Testament from 1972 to 1984. In 1984 he joined the faculty at the University of Geneva. He taught at Geneva for thirty years and served as Dean of Theology for two years.

His academic research focuses on Biblical patriarchs, the Pentateuch, the Book of Judges, the Biblical canon, and the Ketuvim. At the University of Geneva, de Pury initiated the project The Pentateuque, which focused on the literary origins of the Hebrew Bible. He published the articles El Olam, El-Roï, and Lahaï-Roï.

De Pury is also a cartoonist and published three cartoons, Hello! in 1992, Big Bang in 1994, and Oh, Sorry! And Other Biblical Exclamations in 2007.

De Pury served as the head of the center for Ancient Near East Studies. He is a member of the Swiss Academy of Humanities and Social Sciences and the Racines et Sources Foundation.

He was awarded honorary doctorates from the University of Zürich and Eötvös Loránd University.

References 

Living people
1940 births
20th-century Swiss historians
21st-century Swiss historians
Bible commentators
Hermeneutists
Barons of Germany
Albert
Nobility of Neuchâtel
Old Testament scholars
Swiss biblical scholars
Swiss historians of religion
Swiss nobility
University of Basel alumni
Academic staff of the University of Geneva
University of Neuchâtel alumni
Academic staff of the University of Neuchâtel